Zoo Opole, is a zoo in the city of Opole, Poland.  It was founded in 1930. About  in extent, it houses around 1000 animals of about 240 different species. It is located on Bolko Island in the Oder River.

External links

Zoos in Poland
Buildings and structures in Opole
Tourist attractions in Opole Voivodeship
Zoos established in 1930
1930 establishments in Poland